Shivnarayan Jagirdar is an Indian politician and member of the Bharatiya Janata Party. Jagirdar is a member of the Madhya Pradesh Legislative Assembly from the Ujjain Dakshin constituency in Ujjain district.

References 

People from Ujjain
Bharatiya Janata Party politicians from Madhya Pradesh
Madhya Pradesh MLAs 2003–2008
Madhya Pradesh MLAs 2008–2013
Living people
Year of birth missing (living people)